Oscar Olson may refer to:
 Oscar Olson (tug of war) (1878–1963), American tug of war athlete
 Oscar L. Olson (1872–1956), president of Luther College
 Oscar R. Olson (1869–1945), member of the Wisconsin State Senate
 Oscar Olson (basketball) (1917–1997), American basketball player

See also
 Oscar Olsson (1877–1950), regarded as the father of study circles
 Oscar Olsen (1908–2004), Norwegian politician
 Oscar Reynert Olsen, Norwegian artist